Obert Bika (born 11 May 1993) is a Papua New Guinean footballer who plays as a midfielder for Lae City FC. He made his debut for the national team on June 17, 2016.

References

1993 births
Living people
Association football midfielders
Papua New Guinea international footballers
Papua New Guinean footballers
2016 OFC Nations Cup players